The House of Gediminid or simply the Gediminids were a dynasty of monarchs in the Grand Duchy of Lithuania that reigned from the 14th to the 16th century. A cadet branch of this family, known as the Jagiellonian dynasty, reigned also in the Kingdom of Poland, Kingdom of Hungary and Kingdom of Bohemia. Several other branches ranked among the leading aristocratic dynasties of Russia and Poland into recent times.

Their monarchical title in Lithuanian primarily was, by some folkloristic data, kunigų kunigas ("Duke of Dukes"), and later on, didysis kunigas ("Great/High Duke") or, in a simple manner, karalius or kunigaikštis. In the 18th century, the latter form was changed into tautological didysis kunigaikštis, which nevertheless would be translated as "Grand Duke" (for its etymology, see Grand Prince).

Origin
The origin of Gediminas himself is much debated. Some sources say he was Vytenis' ostler, others that he was of peasant stock. Some historians consider him as the son or grandson of Lithuanian or Yatvingian King/duke Skalmantas. Most scholars agree, however, that Gediminas was Vytenis' brother (the parentage of Vytenis is explained differently in various fake genealogies, compiled from the 16th century onwards; according to the latest Polish research, his parentage cannot be established).

Confirmed Gediminid rulers
 Gediminas
 Jaunutis
 Algirdas
 Jogaila
 Kęstutis
 Vytautas – King/Grand Duke from 1392 to 1430
 Švitrigaila
 Sigismund Kęstutaitis
 Casimir IV Jagiellon
 Alexander Jagiellon
 Sigismund I the Old
 Sigismund II Augustus

Branches of the dynasty 

The Eastern Orthodox branches of the family were mostly Ruthenian, which also was one of the two main languages of their established state. Some of these families (e.g., Czartoryski) later converted to Roman Catholicism and became Polonized. Others (e.g., Galitzine) moved to Muscovy and became thoroughly Russified.

In Poland, most Gediminid families (such as Olelkowicz-Słucki, Wiśniowiecki, Zbaraski) are extinct, but at least some families survive to the present: Chowański, Czartoryski, Sanguszko, Siesicki (Dowmont-Siesicki, Szeszycki) and Koriatowicz-Kurcewicz..

The Russian Gediminid families include Bulgakov, Golitsin, Kurakin, Khovansky, Troubetzkoy, Mstislavsky, Belsky, and Volynsky. Some of these families also survive as of 2020.

Gediminid descendants
I. The descendants of *Bujwid Vytianis Rex. King Lithuania.
 Dukes Prince of Bujwid
I. The descendants of Narimantas:
 Dukes of 
 Dukes of 
 Dukes of 
 Dukes of 
 Dukes of 
 Dukes of Golitsyn
 Dukes of Kurakin
 Dukes of 
 Dukes of  
 Dukes of Korecki
  Dukes of 

II. The descendants of Algirdas:
 Duke Andrei of Polotsk
 Dukes of 
 Dukes of 
 Dmitrijus Algirdaitis
 Dukes of Trubetskoy (Trubchevsk)
 
 Dukes of Czartoryski
 Vladimiras Algirdaitis 
 Olelkaičiai (descendants of )
 Dukes of Belsky
 The descendants of Kaributas
 Dukes of  
 Dukes of Wiśniowiecki
 Dukes of  
 Dukes of 
 Dukes of  
 The descendants of  
 Dukes of 
 Dukes of Kobryn
 Dukes of Sanguszko
 The Jagiellons
 The descendants of Lengvenis
 Dukes of Mstislavsky

III. The descendants of Kęstutis
 Patrikas Kęstutaitis
 Vaidotas Kęstutaitis
 Butautas Kęstutaitis
 Vytautas the Great
 Tautvilas Kęstutaitis
 Žygimantas Kęstutaitis

IV. The descendants of Jaunutis:
 Dukes of Zaslavsky
 Dukes of Mstislavsky

V. The descendants of Liubartas (faded in the first half of the 15th century)

VI. , descended from Karijotas 
 Dukes of Podilskyi (nobility)
 Dukes of

Family tree

See also 
 Columns of Gediminas
 Family of Gediminas
 Galitzine family
 List of Lithuanian rulers
 List of Ukrainian rulers
 Palemonids

References

External links 

 
Dynasty genealogy